Worms have played major roles in world mythology and its associated literatures. The word was often used to describe creatures now classified as snakes, lindworms, serpents and dragons. Its symbolic meaning is divided between death and renewal.

Worms continue to play mixed roles in modern cultures. The current usage of worm as a type of malicious Internet software is derived from John Brunner's 1975 science fiction novel The Shockwave Rider. More positive interpretations, based on the concept of the friendly 'bookworm' or mutated forms of the common earthworm, are found in many recent books, especially those written for children.

On Pink Floyd's album The Wall, worms were used as "symbols of negative forces within ourselves."

Although more usually used to describe the common earthworm, the English language word "worm" derives from Old Norse orm and Old English wyrm, meaning "serpent" or "dragon". The synonymous usage of worm and dragon in English lessened during the following centuries. Samuel Johnson's dictionary drew a distinction between worms and dragons (while retaining the word serpent as a definition of worm) and the last synonymous usage of worm and dragon as noted in the Oxford English Dictionary dates to the 17th century.

Níðhöggr (the 'Dread Biter') and Midgard's Worm were two of the most famous "Worms" in Viking mythology. At the 'still point of the turning world' the Vikings believed the ash tree Yggdrasil bore the weight of the universe. One of its three roots stretched over the underworld Niflheim where the dragon Nidhogg gnawed at it in an attempt to destroy creation – hence its name 'The Dread Biter'. This legend was later used by fantasy writer Terry Pratchett.

Midgard's Worm or Jorungard's Worm lay in the sea with its tail in its mouth, encircling the lands of the world and creating the oceans. If the Worm's tail was ever removed from its mouth disaster would befall the earth and in legend Midgard's Worm met its end at Ragnarök when it dies fighting, and killing, the thunder god Thor. This story may have been the inspiration for "The Worm of the World's End" which appears in the novels of Stephen R. Donaldson. The Midgard Worm is also known as the World Serpent.

Several places in Great Britain, once occupied by Viking raiders, owe their names to the supposed resemblance they bore to this fictional beast. Worm's Head on the Gower Peninsula in Wales was thought to resemble a sleeping dragon . There are many legends in the north east of England relating to gigantic 'worms' which terrorised the local area before being slain by a hero. The Lambton Worm, Sockburn Worm and Worm of Linton are among the best known of these. The North East was raided and occupied by the Vikings for centuries during the Dark Ages and these legends may refer to heroes fighting the invaders, personified as monstrous Viking worm dragons. The Durham historian Hutchinson believed the legend of the Sockburn worm, for example, referred to a Viking raider who plundered the Tees valley before being repulsed. The notion of the Sockburn worm itself was used by Lewis Carroll as the basis of his nonsense rhyme "Jabberwocky".

See also 
List of fictional worms

References 

Invertebrates in popular culture